Arsenaria is a genus of snout moths. It was described by Ragonot in 1891, and is found in Algeria, Tunisia, Iran, Syria and Iraq.

Species
 Arsenaria caidalis (Hampson, 1900)
 Arsenaria dattinii (Ragonot, 1887)
 Arsenaria indistinctalis (Amsel, 1949)
 Arsenaria kebilialis (D. Lucas, 1907)
 Arsenaria sanctalis (Hampson, 1900)
 Arsenaria strictalis (Amsel, 1949)
 Arsenaria vesceritalis (Chrétien, 1913)
 Arsenaria wiltshirei (Amsel, 1949)

References

Hypotiini
Pyralidae genera